Alan Elsdon (15 October 1934 – 2 May 2016) was an English jazz trumpeter and flugelhornist.

Biography
Elsdon was born in London on 15 October 1934. He studied trumpet under Tommy McQuater. His early professional work included time with Cy Laurie (1954–56), Graham Stewart and his 'Graham Stewart Seven' (1957–58), a Royal Air Force band, and Terry Lightfoot (1959–61); with Lightfoot he played alongside Kid Ory and Red Allen. Elsdon led his own band from 1961 (he made an appearance on 1 June 1962 in a TV series called All That Jazz) into the 1990s, and during the 1960s also played with Edmond Hall, Albert Nicholas, Wingy Manone, and Howlin' Wolf.

Elsdon played in Keith Nichols's Midnite Follies Orchestra from 1978 to 1985, as well as in small groups with Nichols around the same time. The Alan Elsdon Band made an appearance at a 'jazz weekend' in November, 1991 at Badger's Mount Jazz Club in Halstead, Kent.

He was also active as a writer and educator.

He died on 2 May 2016.

Discography
 Jazz Journeymen (Black Lion, 1977)
 Dixieland Favourites (EMI & Hamlyn, 1970)
 Alan Elsdon Presents... (Columbia UK, 1964)

References

British jazz trumpeters
Male trumpeters
1934 births
2016 deaths
21st-century trumpeters
21st-century British male musicians
British male jazz musicians
Black Lion Records artists